Policy studies is a subdiscipline of political science that includes the analysis of the process of policymaking (the policy process) and the contents of policy (policy analysis). Policy analysis includes substantive area research (such as health or education policy), program evaluation and impact studies, and policy design. It "involves systematically studying the nature, causes, and effects of alternative public policies, with particular emphasis on determining the policies that will achieve given goals." It emerged in the United States in the 1960s and 1970s.

Policy studies also examines the conflicts and conflict resolution that arise from the making of policies in civil society, the private sector, or more commonly, in the public sector (e.g. government).

While policy studies frequently focus on the public sector it is applicable to other organizations (e.g., the not-for-profit sector).  Some policy study experts graduate from public policy schools with public policy degrees.  Alternatively, experts may have backgrounds in policy analysis, program evaluation, sociology, psychology, philosophy, economics, anthropology, geography, law, political science, social work, environmental planning and public administration.

Traditionally, the field of policy studies focused on domestic policy, with the notable exceptions of foreign and defense policies. However, the wave of economic globalization, which ensued in the late twentieth and early twenty-first centuries, created a need for a subset of policy studies that focuses on global governance, especially as it relates to issues that transcend national borders such as climate change, terrorism, nuclear proliferation, and economic development.  This subset of policy studies, which is often referred to as international policy studies, typically requires mastery of a second language and attention to cross-cultural issues in order to address national and cultural biases.

See also
 Association for Public Policy Analysis and Management
 Public policy
 Public policy schools
 Public administration
 Public policy of the United States

References

External links 
General
 
 Policy Studies Organization

Journals of the Policy Studies Organization
 Asian Politics & Policy
 Digest of Middle East Studies 
 Latin American Policy
Policy Studies
 Policy Studies Journal
 Politics & Policy
 Review of Policy Research
 Policy & Internet
 Poverty & Public Policy
 Risk, Hazards & Crisis in Public Policy
 World Medical & Health Policy

Other
 Visualization of the policy cycle
 National Association of Schools of Public Affairs and Administration
 Decision Theater - Helping policy makers in their decision making process through the use of visualization, simulation and collaboration tools.
 AARP Public Policy Institute (United States)
 The Hoover Digest
 Global Public Policy Institute

Policy
Politics by issue
Public policy research
Political science
Public administration